Hong Lei (born 1960) is one of the leading artists in the era of China's New Photography movement in the 1990s.

Early life
Hong was born in Changzhou, Jiangsu in 1960 and graduated from Nanjing University of the Arts in 1987. In 1992, he went to the China Central Academy of Fine Arts to pursue advanced studies in printmaking. Inspired by his early art experience in Yuan Ming Yuan and learning from traditional Chinese paintings, he returned to Changzhou and soon started to use photography as a way of art representation since 1996.

Works
Hong's renowned works include Autumn in the Forbidden City (1997), Chinese Landscape (1998), After Liang Kai's (Song Dynasty) Masterpiece Sakyamuni Coming Out of Retirement (1998), I Dreamt that I was Hung Upside Down to Listen to Huizong Play the Zither with Chairman Mao (2004) and Nothing to Hide (2008), among others. Apart from his success in digital photos, he started to photograph black and white Shan shui landscapes as an ongoing experimental project since 2000 to rethink Chinese traditional aesthetics. In recent years, he has also explored the various boundaries and possibilities of photography by painting his own photos on silk, as well as video & installation works. His selected solo and group exhibitions include Recontres d' Arles: Arles Phototography Festival (Arles, France, 2003), Alors, La Chine?, Chinese Contemporary Art Exhibition (Pompidou Centre, Paris, 2003), Seven Worthies (solo exhibition, Beijing, 2007), Seasons (solo exhibition, Beijing, New York, 2008), 2011 Chengdu Biennale, Mi Lou (solo exhibition, Beijing, 2012) and Perfume This is Not (solo exhibition, Shanghai, 2012). Now he lives and works in Changzhou and Shanghai.

Exhibitions

Solo exhibitions
 2012, Mi Lou: Recent Works by Hong Lei, Chambers Fine Art, Beijing
 2009, Seasons: Recent Works by Hong Lei, Chambers Fine Art, New York
 2007, Seven Worthies, Today Art Museum, Beijing
 2006, Lost: New Works by Hong Lei, Aura Gallery, Shanghai
 2006, Still-Life: Photograph by Hong Lei, Chambers Fine Art, New York
 2006, Ain't Here: Photograph by Hong Lei, Zhu Qizhan Art Museum, Shanghai
 2006, Last Night in My Dream: Hong Lei's Photographic Works, JianSongGe Gallery, Taipei
 2003, Hong Lei, Rencontres d'Arles festival, Arles, France
 2003, Hong Lei's Narrative, Chambers Fine Art, New York, USA
 2002, Chinese Texture of the Soul, China Art Archives & Warehouse, Beijing
 1993, Metaphysical Poetry, Cifa Gallery, Beijing, China Photography Naarden, Netherlands

Group exhibitions
 2011, Pure Views: Contemporary Art Exhibition, Chengdu Biennale, Chengdu
 2011, Community of Tastes: Chinese Contemporary Art since 2000, Museu de Arte Contemporânea da Universidade de São Paulo, São Paulo, Brazil
 2010, Still Life: Chinese Contemporary Photography, Three Shadows Photography Centre, Beijing, China
 2008, La Escuela Yi: Trenta Años de Arte Abstracto Chino, CaixaForum, Madrid, Spain
 2008, FotoFest 2008, FotoFest Biennial, Houston, TX, USA
 2008, Zhù Yi! China actual photography, Institut de Cultura de Barcelona, Barcelona, Spain
 2008, New Photo - Ten years, Carolina Nitsch, New York, NY USA
 2008, 55 Days in Valencia: Chinese Art Meeting, IVAM, Valencia
 2007, Net: Re-imaginging Space, Time and Culture, Chambers Fine Art, Beijing
 2006, The 6th Gwangju Biennale, Gwangju
 2005, Mahjong: Contemporary Chinese Art from the Sigg Collection, Kunstmuseum, Bern
 2005, Dreaming of the Dragon's Nation: Contemporary Art Exhibition from China, Irish Museum of Modern Art, Dublin
 2005, Always to the Front: Chinese Contemporary Art, Taipei
 2004, Between Past and Future: New Photography and Video From China, International Center of Photography, New York, Seattle Art Museum, Museum of Contemporary Art Chicago, The David and Alfred Smart Museum of Art, USA
 2003, Alors, la Chine?, Centre Pompidou, Paris, France
 2003, Arles International Photography Festival, Arles, France

Collections 
 2001, After 'Qiu Ju An Chun Tu' (Li Anzhong, Song Dynasty), collected by the French Ministry of Culture
 2003, Embroidered spring dreams: Illustration of the 'Golden-Vase Plums' poems, collected by Museum of Fine Arts, Boston
 2003, Autumn in the Forbidden City, collected by International Center of Photography (ICP), New York
 2004, After Liang Kai's (Song Dynasty) Masterpiece Sakyamuni Coming Out of Retirement and I Dreamt of Being Killed by My Father While I Was Flying Over an Immortal Land, Smart Museum of Art, the University of Chicago, Chicago
 2005, After Zhao Mengfu's Autumn Colors on the Que and Hua Mountains, collected by Shanghai Art Museum, Shanghai
 2005, Chinese Landscape, collected by Guangdong Museum of Art, Guangzhou
 2005, Speak, Memory, collected by the Nasher Museum of Art at Duke University, Durham, North Carolina, USA
 2006, Speak, Memory, collected by Embassy of the United States, Beijing, China
 2006, Autumn in the Forbidden City, collected by Today Art Museum, Beijing
 2008, A Picture of Loquats and Mountain Birds by Zhao Ji, Dynasty Painting Lotus from the Water and Secret Fragrance and Dappled Shadow, collected by The Museum of Modern Art (MoMA), New York
 2012, Ink Mountain, collected by Guangdong Museum of Art, Guangzhou

References 

 New Photo, Staged and Conceptual Work, 1994-1998, China Exhibition, 2008 FotoFest, Houston, 2008
 Where Do You Come From? Where Are You Going? - An Interview with Hong Lei by Wu Hung, Professor, University of Chicago, 2007 
 Mi Lou: Recent Works by Hong Lei, by Edward Sanderson, Art Slant, February 2012
 Between Past and Future, by Sydney Pokorny, Frieze Magazine, Issue 87, November–December 2004

Publications 
 Hong Lei : conversing with the ancients, by Wu Hung, published by Lincoln : University of Nebraska, 2009

External links 
 About Hong Lei, Chambers Fine Art, New York
 Hong Lei at Three Shadows Photography Art Center, Beijing
 Hong Lei at ARTLINKART, Shanghai

Chinese photographers
1960 births
Artists from Changzhou
Living people
Chinese contemporary artists